Little Canada, previously known as Our Home and Miniature Land, is a tourist attraction located at The Tenor, near Yonge–Dundas Square in Toronto, Ontario, Canada. It contains HO scale replicas of natural and man-made structures located throughout Canada, including Golden Horseshoe, Niagara Falls, Ottawa, Quebec City, and Toronto.

It opened on 5 August 2021.

History
Dutchman Jean-Louis Brenninkmeijer moved to Canada in 1999 for a two-year stint of specialty retail management training at his family's company C&A Canadian stores. He and his wife Mimi decided to make the move permanent, settling in Oakville. He created the concept for Little Canada in 2011 shortly after visiting Miniatur Wunderland in Hamburg, Germany.

Brenninkmeijer sent emails to eight model railway clubs in the Greater Toronto and Hamilton Area (GTHA) requesting assistance to realize his vision for a miniature Canada. Only David MacLean, a civil engineer and president of The Model Railroad Club of Toronto, agreed to consider the project, and later met with Brenninkmeijer at Square One Shopping Centre in Mississauga. They would eventually meet every other week for 18 months, and in 2013 incorporated Our Home and Miniature Land.

Brenninkmeijer invested $5 million to develop the project, and received an additional $12 million for the project from 120 investors. By July 2021, the total investment had been $24 million from 200 investors.

A number of model enthusiasts were hired, who from 2014 to 2019 collectively worked about 100,000 hours in a Mississauga warehouse to create the scale-model components. Among them were about 50 artists, including model makers, specialists in mechatronics and animation, and scenic artists. Other specialists included architects, digital artists, electricians, painters, plumbers, sculptors, and visual artists.

The exhibit was designed to be assembled and disassembled, allowing for it to be moved. The attraction was moved to 10 Dundas Street East in Toronto when 2 underground storeys of that building were vacated by GoodLife Fitness in mid 2019. They signed a 20-year lease for that location in August 2019.

The destinations of the attraction are installed in two storeys covering .

The attraction was expected to open in July 2020, but was delayed as result of the COVID-19 pandemic in Ontario.

Destinations
The attraction is split into a number of destinations, each representing some part of Canada. At its opening, these included Little Golden Horseshoe (Golden Horseshoe), Little Niagara (Horseshoe Falls and the city of Niagara Falls), Little Ottawa (Ottawa), Little Toronto (Toronto), Petit Quebec (Quebec City), and Little North (Northern Canada). The latter was still under construction when the attraction opened. Each destination undergoes a repeating 15-minute day cycle transition from sunrise to sunset.

The key features of each destination are built to scale, with some landmarks and buildings based on the structure's blueprints. Each was digitally designed and split into pieces that were then laser cut from various materials, including balsa, plywood, and styrene. Members of the team designing a destination travel to the site, and each destination has an assigned ambassador who provides "insight into the culture of a place".

The cost to design and build  was between $500 and $1,200, depending on the complexity of the design; a rural scene would have little variation and fewer features than a city block. Each destination requires 9 to 12 months to complete.

Little Toronto
The Toronto destination, which took over 35,000 hours to design and build, includes GO Transit trains and Union Station, the Art Gallery of Ontario, Toronto City Hall, helicopters, streetcars, the Don Valley Parkway, and the Gardiner Expressway. During the morning portion, sound effects include chirping birds, barking dogs, and garbage trucks making rounds. During the sunset portion of the exhibit, the skyline is lit by 30,000 LEDs, with sounds of crickets and sirens. The field depicts the instance Joe Carter hit a walk-off home run to clinch the Blue Jays' victory in the 1993 World Series against the Philadelphia Phillies.

The CN Tower also includes several figurines of individuals on the EdgeWalk. The Art Gallery of Ontario building had to be built smaller than scale, with portions truncated to fit within the allocated space.

Also depicted are historic sites and structures such as the Distillery District, Royal York Hotel, St. Lawrence Market, and Prince Edward Viaduct.

Little Ottawa
The Ottawa destination has a replica of the Canadian Parliament Buildings set during Canada Day, as well as the Château Laurier with a missing back wall to enable visitors to see the furnished rooms, and the Canada Revenue Agency building. Also part of the destination is the ByWard Market featuring horse-drawn carriages, and the Rideau Canal. The design includes particular attention to streetscape; for example, street signs have the same design as those in the city.

Little Niagara
The Niagara Falls destination features a flowing  Horseshoe Falls, the Rainbow Bridge, Clifton Hill, and Niagara-on-the-Lake. The latter features vineyards.

Others
The Little North exhibit will be kept in a cooler, temperature-controlled room, so that visitors can see their breath as they exhale. The Golden Horseshoe destination includes a  replica of the Burlington Bay James N. Allan Skyway, as well as the Highway of Heroes, a bridge over which is dedicated to Nichola Goddard, who died in a grenade attack in Panjwayi District in May 2006, becoming the first Canadian woman to die in combat.

The Quebec City destination is set in the winter and includes the Château Frontenac, as well as nearby sites such as Mont-Sainte-Anne.

A portion of the exhibit will feature displays of incomplete destinations in progress of construction.

Future destinations to be added include Montreal, Atlantic Canada (including Halifax Harbour, the Bay of Fundy, and tall ships at Lunenburg), the Canadian Prairies, the Canadian Rockies, and the west coast. One new destination will open each year.

The design team also plans to add a depiction of the memorial of shoes and stuffed toys at the Centennial Flame that occurred after the discovery of unmarked graves at the Kamloops Indian Residential School.

Littlization Station
Visitors can enter a booth called the "Littlization Station" at the attraction, which contains 128 cameras that will simultaneously take photographs of the visitor. These will be used to create two -scale replica 3D printed models of the individual, one of which can be placed within the exhibit at a location chosen by the visitor, and the other taken home as a souvenir.

Easter eggs
The exhibits contain numerous Easter eggs, such as a red panda from the film Turning Red in the Chinatown section of the Toronto exhibit.

References

See also
Cullen Gardens and Miniature Village

External links

Miniature version of Canada now on display in downtown Toronto

Model railway shows and exhibitions
Museums in Toronto
Tourist attractions in Toronto
2021 establishments in Ontario
Miniature parks